Sofía Cancino de Cuevas (July 29, 1897 – December 16, 1982) was a Mexican composer, pianist, opera promoter, singer, and her country's first woman symphonic conductor.

Biography
Sofía Cancino de Cuevas was born in Mexico City on July 29, 1897. At age 22 she obtained the title of piano teacher at the Pedro Luis Ogazón Academy. In 1932 she entered the National Autonomous University of Mexico (UNAM) School of Music, where she studied singing with Consuelo Escobar de Castro and David Silva, as well as complementary composition courses with Rafael J. Tello, Manuel Ponce and Julián Carrillo. In 1935 the Adagio and the Allegro of her First Symphony premiered at the Simón Bolívar Amphitheater.

In 1937 she began her career as a performer, playing Mozart's Krönungskozert for piano and orchestra and singing various opera arias in the mezzo-soprano tessitura. That same year her concerto for piano and orchestra was released. The following year, she debuted in the role of Rosina in the opera The Barber of Seville in the Auditorium of the American School, alongside tenor  and under the direction of J.M. Acuña. In 1939, Cancino de Cuevas completed her composition studies. That year she premiered her first quartet for strings, catalogued as Op. 1. In 1940, she received an honorable mention for her symphonic poem El gallo en Pátzcuaro for orchestra and male choir, in a contest organized by UNAM. In 1941 she directed the presentation of Mozart's Don Giovanni at the Arbeu theater, with the participation of singers  (baritone), Carlos Mejía (tenor), and Margarita Cueto (soprano), among others. This made her Mexico's first female conductor. In 1944 she founded the Opera School, with which she conducted La serva padrona by Giovanni Battista Pergolesi, Bastien und Bastienne by Wolfgang Amadeus Mozart, and Il matrimonio segreto by Domenico Cimarosa at the Palacio de Bellas Artes in November of that same year.

In 1947 Cancino de Cuevas sang the lead role of Gioachino Rossini's La Cenerentola at the Palacio de Bellas Artes, under the baton of Umberto Mugnai. In the Beethoven room of the Hotel Reforma she presented violinist Jeanne Court and the singers Lorenzo Canno and Alfred Knopf. In successive years she presented complete operas with costumes and set design at private functions as part of her opera dissemination activities. Among them were the 1962 Mexican run of Rossini's L'italiana in Algeri, where she played the main role of Isabella, once again under the baton of Umberto Mugnai. Under her orchestral direction and arrangement, she presented operas such as The Barber of Seville by Rossini, Don Pasquale, L'elisir d'amore, and Lucia di Lammermoor by Gaetano Donizetti, and La traviata by Giuseppe Verdi. Of her prolific output as a composer, only a small part was released; the rest, including all of her operas, remains unpublished.

Sofía Cancino de Cuevas died in Mexico City on December 16, 1982 at age 85.

Works
Sofía Cancino de Cuevas was the author of just under a hundred pieces, including works for symphonic orchestra, operas, orchestra and choir, chamber music, solo piano, and piano and voice. The work of Cancino remains virtually unpublished. At present it is cataloged by Alejandro Duprat. The task has led the musician to think that Cancino may be the first Mexican woman composer to have created a symphony. Duprat also managed to compile a list of the works of Cancino that, despite being recorded among her output, are missing, including a concert for piano and orchestra, the Second Symphony, and the operas Michoacana and Promesa d'artista e parola di re. Currently, the works that remain in the hands of the family are in the process of registration with the Society of Authors and Composers of Mexico. The main objective is to interest orchestras in performing the composer's creations.

Symphonic works
 First Symphony
 Second Symphony in G Major
 Piano Concerto
 C'est la vie, symphonic poem
 Un gallo en Pátzcuaro, symphonic poem for orchestra and male choir. It received an honorable mention in the composition contest convened by the National Autonomous University of Mexico in 1940.

Chamber music
 Quartet for Strings, Op. 1
 Numerous concert songs for voice and piano based on poems by various contemporary poets

Operas
 Annette, opera in one act with libretto in French, composed in 1945
 Michoacana, opera, date of composition unknown
 Promesa d'artista e parola di re, opera, date of composition unknown

Honors
 Member of the Association of Mexican University Students, whose registration appears as a music teacher, composer, singer, and orchestra director
 Acknowledgments by José Montes de Oca, General Secretary of the Mexican Musical Athenaeum (June 29, 1939)
 In 1940, Cancino de Cuevas received an honorable mention for her symphonic poem El gallo en Pátzcuaro, for orchestra and male choir, in a contest organized by UNAM.

References

1897 births
1982 deaths
20th-century classical pianists
20th-century Mexican women opera singers
Women opera composers
Mexican classical composers
Mexican classical pianists
Mexican women pianists
Mexican conductors (music)
Mexican women classical composers
Mexican mezzo-sopranos
Mexican opera composers
National Autonomous University of Mexico alumni
Singers from Mexico City
Women classical pianists
Women conductors (music)
20th-century conductors (music)
20th-century women pianists